Treblinka was a Nazi German extermination camp in Poland during World War II.

Treblinka may also refer to:
 Treblinka, Masovian Voivodeship, a village in Poland east of Warsaw
 Treblinka (band), a Finnish hardcore punk band, active from 1985–88; later some members formed Klamydia
 Tiamat (band); initially, they were a Swedish black metal band known as Treblinka from 1987 to 1989